Sabrina Gonzalez Pasterski (born June 3, 1993) is an American theoretical physicist from Chicago who studies high energy physics. She describes herself as "a proud first-generation Cuban-American and Chicago Public Schools alumna". She completed her undergraduate studies at the Massachusetts Institute of Technology (MIT), earned her PhD from Harvard University and is a PCTS Postdoctoral Fellow at Princeton University.  According to Google Trends, Pasterski was the #3 Trending Scientist for all of 2017. In 2015, she was named to the Forbes 30 under 30 Science list, named a Forbes 30 under 30 All Star in 2017, and returned as a judge in 2018 as part of Forbes' first ever all-female Science category judging panel.  She is known for her unusual list of accomplishments including a 5.00 undergraduate GPA from MIT.

Early life
Pasterski was born in New Jersey on June 3 1993, to Mark Pasterski and Maria Gonzalez. Her father, an attorney and an electrical engineer, encouraged her to follow her dreams. She enrolled at the Edison Regional Gifted Center in 1998, and graduated from the Illinois Mathematics and Science Academy in 2010.

She took her first flying lesson in 2003, piloted FAA1 at EAA AirVenture Oshkosh in 2005 and started building a kit aircraft by 2006. Her first U.S. solo flight was in that kit aircraft in 2009 after being signed off by her CFI Jay Maynard.

In her 2012 Scientific American 30 under 30 interview, Pasterski named among her scientific heroes Leon Lederman, Dudley Herschbach, and Freeman Dyson, and said she was drawn to physics by Jeff Bezos. She has received job offers from Blue Origin, an aerospace company founded by Amazon.com's Jeff Bezos, and the National Aeronautics and Space Administration (NASA).

Education and academia
As a sophomore at MIT, Pasterski was part of the Compact Muon Solenoid experiment at the Large Hadron Collider.  While a graduate student at Harvard, she worked with Andrew Strominger. Her early work resulted in discovery of the "spin memory effect" which may be used to detect or verify the net effects of gravitational waves.  She then completed the Pasterski–Strominger–Zhiboedov Triangle for electromagnetic memory in a 2015 solo paper that Stephen Hawking cited in early 2016. She earned her PhD in Physics from Harvard University in May 2019. She is projected to complete a postdoc at Princeton University's Princeton Center for Theoretical Science in 2022, and is currently on leave from a Faculty-Physics position at the Perimeter Institute for Theoretical Physics.

Media coverage

Hawking's citation of Pasterski's solo work on the PSZ Triangle was publicized by actor George Takei when he quoted her on his Twitter account: "Hopefully I'm known for what I do and not what I don't do." The Steven P. Jobs Trust article included in the tweet has been shared 1,200,000 times.

Pasterski's 2016 work in promoting the Let Girls Learn initiative was recognized by an invitation to the White House, a congratulatory message from the White House played on network television, and a two-page spread in Marie Claires January 2017 issue with former First Lady Michelle Obama.

Pasterski's continuing efforts to promote science, technology, engineering, and mathematics (STEM) education for girls in Cuba has been recognized by the Annenberg Foundation.

Pasterski's 2017 work in promoting STEM education for girls in Russia has been recognized by the U.S Embassy in Moscow and by the Moscow Polytech.

International print and television coverage of Pasterski's work has appeared in Russian, Polish, Czech, Spanish, German, Hindi and French: Russia Today, Poland's Angora magazine, DNES magazine in the Czech Republic, People en Español, Jolie in Germany, Vanitha TV in India, Madame magazine in France, le Figaro magazine Paris, Femina magazine in Switzerland, and Marie Claire España. In 2016, R&B singer Chris Brown posted a page with a video promoting her. Forbes and The History Channel ran stories about Gonzalez Pasterski for their audiences in Mexico and Latin America, respectively.

Checking the accuracy of media portrayals, Snopes found that the "viral meme about [the] Harvard University graduate student gets most (but not all) of the facts right." Pasterski and Hawking do not follow each other on Twitter, since neither Hawking nor Pasterski had a Twitter account, Snopes stated instead that "the truth is actually much more interesting" pointing out that two scientific papers published in 2016 and co-authored by Hawking cited two pieces of research co-authored by Pasterski and one written solely by her. Pasterski keeps a list of personal responses to media portrayals on her website.

Awards and honors

 2010, Illinois Aviation Trades Association Industry Achievement Award
 2012, Lindau Nobel Laureate Meetings Young Researcher
 2013, MIT Physics Department Orloff Scholarship Award
 2015, Hertz Foundation Fellowship
 2015, Forbes’ 30 under 30 2015: Science
 2016, Marie Claire Young Women Honors Recipient: “The Genius” 
 2017, Forbes 30 under 30 All Star Alumni
 2017, Silicon Valley Comic Con Headliner
2018, Albert Einstein Foundation Genius 100 Visions Project – "One of the 100 greatest innovators, artists, scientists and visionaries of our time."
2018, Discovery Canada's International Women's Day honoree.

References

External links
 
 Publications by Sabrina Pasterski on INSPIRE

1993 births
Living people
21st-century American physicists
American people of Cuban descent
American people of Polish descent
Harvard University alumni
Massachusetts Institute of Technology alumni
People associated with CERN
Scientists from Chicago
American women physicists
MIT Department of Physics alumni
21st-century American women scientists